Hussein Abdo Khalil Hamza (24 August 1949 – 6 August 2022) was an Egyptian counselor who served as President of Egyptian State Lawsuits Authority from 1 July 2017 to 24 August 2019. He also served as the President of Aswan Club from 2012 to 2014. He was born in the village of Abreem, Nasr City, Nuba, Aswan Governorate.

Presidency of the State Lawsuits Authority 
He was appointed chairman of the State Lawsuits Authority, on 1 July 2017, by a decree of President Abdel Fattah al-Sisi.

On 22 August 2019, Hussein retired and was succeeded by Abu Bakr al-Seddiq Amer as the new head of the State Lawsuits Authority.

References

External links 
 
 Hussein Abdo Khalil. The Centre of Judicial Studies and Training

1949 births
2022 deaths
Ain Shams University alumni
People from Aswan Governorate